Clifford N. Geary (February 26, 1916 – May 31, 2008) was an American illustrator of science fiction, especially Robert A. Heinlein's "juvenile series" published by Scribner's from 1948 to 1956, and of popular science.

Many of his Heinlein illustrations are done in a  reversed-ground white-on-black style.  Alexei Panshin's "Heinlein in Dimension" (a controversial work that Heinlein is said to have disavowed) acknowledges Geary's contribution to this important element of the Heinlein oeuvre, calling his work "quite unusual and quite striking."

Geary was raised in the Boston area and was educated at the Massachusetts School of Art.  In later life he lived in Brooklyn and the Adirondacks.  His book illustrations were sometimes credited to "Clifford Geary".

Books illustrated

By Geary 
 Ticonderoga: A Picture Story, by Clifford N. Geary, David McKay Company, New York, 50 p.

Heinlein
 Space Cadet, 1948
 Red Planet, 1949
 Farmer in the Sky, 1950
 Between Planets, 1951
 The Rolling Stones, 1952
 Starman Jones, 1953
 The Star Beast, 1954
 Time for the Stars, 1956
 The Unpleasant Profession of Jonathan Hoag (collected stories), 1959 (not in the juvenile series)

Margaret O. Hyde
 Atoms Today & Tomorrow by Margaret O. Hyde, revised edition, McGraw Hill, 1959
 Exploring Earth and Space by Margaret O. Hyde, McGraw-Hill, 159 p., various years 1957-1967
 Where Speed is King by Margaret and Edwin Hyde, McGraw-Hill, 1955, 1961

Other
 Signal Hill by Edward A. Herron
 Clara Barton, Red Cross Pioneer by Alberta Powell Graham, New York: Abingdon Press, 1956
 Science the Super Sleuth by Lynn Poole, McGraw Hill, 1954
 Your Trip into Space by Lynn Poole, McGraw-Hill
 The Hideout Club by Frank Reilly, Rinehart, 147 p., 1948
 The Magic Bat by Clem Philbrook, Macmillan, 1954
 The Real Book About Space Travel by Hal Goodwin, Garden City Books, 1952

References

External links 

 
 

Geary, Clifford N.
2008 deaths
1916 births